Holmes County is a county located in the U.S. state of Ohio. As of the 2020 census, the population was 44,223. Its county seat is Millersburg. The county was formed in 1824 from portions of Coshocton, Tuscarawas and Wayne counties and organized the following year. It was named after Andrew Holmes, an officer killed in the War of 1812. 

Holmes County, which was about 42% Amish in 2010, and 48% in 2020, has the highest concentration of Amish in the world, which draws many visitors to the county. The Holmes Amish settlement (which also includes Amish from the neighbouring counties, such as: Wayne, Coshocton, Tuscarawas and Stark) is the second biggest one in the world (after the Lancaster County, Pennsylvania) and numbered 37,770 people in 2021.

History
Holmes County was formed on January 20, 1824, from portions of Coshocton, Tuscarawas and Wayne counties. It was named after Major Andrew Holmes, a fatal casualty in the Battle of Mackinac Island. 

In 1863, during the Civil War, numerous small anti-draft riots took place, mainly in the German-speaking areas. Holmes County at the time was a Democratic stronghold, dominated by its Pennsylvania Dutch settlers, along with many recent German immigrants. With the passage of the Conscription Act in March 1863, Holmes County politicians denounced both Congress and President Lincoln as despotic, saying that forced military service was little different from slavery. Conscription had been common in their former German homelands, and it was one of the reasons they had moved to America. Violent protests broke out in June, and they continued until the Union Army marched into the county and declared martial law.  Stephen E. Towne in 2019  using archival records argues that many of the resisters belonged to secret organizations that opposed Union tactics to defeat the Confederacy.

Geography

Adjacent counties
 Wayne County (north)
 Stark County (northeast)
 Tuscarawas County (east)
 Coshocton County (south)
 Knox County (southwest)
 Ashland County (northwest)

Demographics

2000 census
As of the census of 2000, there were 38,943 people, 11,337 households, and 9,194 families living in the county. The population density was 92 people per square mile (36/km2). There were 12,280 housing units at an average density of 29 per square mile (11/km2). The racial makeup of the county was 99.03% White, 0.33% Black or African American, 0.06% Native American, 0.06% Asian, 0.01% Pacific Islander, 0.13% from other races, and 0.40% from two or more races. Hispanic or Latino of any race were 0.75% of the population. 56.1% spoke English, 20.1% Pennsylvania German, 15.8% German and 7.1% "Dutch, i.e. Pennsylvania Dutch." as their first language.

There were 11,337 households, out of which 44.30% had children under the age of 18 living with them, 71.50% were married couples living together, 6.50% had a female householder with no husband present, and 18.90% were non-families. 16.10% of all households were made up of individuals, and 6.90% had someone living alone who was 65 years of age or older. The average household size was 3.35 and the average family size was 3.82.
Religious breakdown for those who gave a religion (68.33 of the total population) was 89.79% Evangelical Protestant, 8.04% Mainline Protestant and 2.16% Catholic. There were 140 Amish congregations with 17,654 adherents. There were several other unrelated Amish congregations and Mennonite congregations. There was one Catholic congregation.

In the county, the population was spread out, with 35.60% under the age of 18, 10.40% from 18 to 24, 25.70% from 25 to 44, 17.80% from 45 to 64, and 10.50% who were 65 years of age or older. The median age was 28 years. For every 100 females there were 99.60 males. For every 100 females age 18 and over, there were 95.50 males.

The median income for a household in the county was $36,944, and the median income for a family was $40,230. Males had a median income of $28,490 versus $20,602 for females. The per capita income for the county was $14,197. About 10.50% of families and 12.90% of the population were below the poverty line, including 17.40% of those under age 18 and 13.30% of those age 65 or over.

Holmes County has a relatively high number of residents who do not speak English at home. According to the 2000 census, almost 36% of the population speak either Pennsylvania German or German at home, and a further 7% speak "Dutch", i.e. Pennsylvania Dutch. 42.92% of the total population and 50.28% of the children in 5-17 age range uses German/Pennsylvania German or "Dutch" at home.

2010 census
As of the 2010 United States Census, there were 42,366 people, 12,554 households, and 10,035 families living in the county. The racial makeup of the county was 98.7% white, 0.3% black or African American, 0.1% Asian, 0.1% American Indian, 0.2% from other races, and 0.5% from two or more races. Those of Hispanic or Latino origin made up 0.8% of the population. In terms of ancestry, 37.8% were German, 10.8% were American, 6.6% were Irish, and 6.3% were English.

Of the 12,554 households, 42.9% had children under the age of 18 living with them, 69.7% were married couples living together, 6.9% had a female householder with no husband present, 20.1% were non-families, and 17.2% of all households were made up of individuals. The average household size was 3.31 and the average family size was 3.80. The median age was 29.7 years.

The median income for a household in the county was $43,533 and the median income for a family was $49,133. Males had a median income of $36,644 versus $24,317 for females. The per capita income for the county was $17,009. About 10.5% of families and 13.3% of the population were below the poverty line, including 18.9% of those under age 18 and 6.9% of those age 65 or over.

Amish community
The Amish community in Holmes County established in 1808, had a 17,654 adherents in 2010, or 41.7% of the county's population.

Economy 
Tourism is an important part of the economy. In 2017, Holmes County was the second most popular tourist destination in Ohio. Tourism is centered on the Amish community, which makes up almost half the county's population, the highest density in the world.

Politics
Prior to 1944, Holmes County was a stronghold of the Democratic Party in presidential elections, with every Democratic presidential candidate from 1856 to 1940, except for Al Smith, carrying the county. The county has since become a Republican stronghold, with Lyndon B. Johnson being the only Democrat since 1940 to carry it, in his 1964 landslide, although Harry S. Truman came within just 16 votes of winning it in 1948.

|}

Communities

CDP = Census-designated place
UIC = Unincorporated community

Transportation

Holmes County Airport  located two miles southwest of Millersburg.

Amish community

A large Amish community of about 36,000 exists in Northeast-Central Ohio, centered on Holmes County and extending into surrounding counties. The Holmes Old Order Amish affiliation, with 140 church districts out of 221 in the Holmes County Amish settlement in 2009, is the main and dominant Amish affiliation. Holmes County houses the highest percentage of Amish of any U.S. county, currently 42 percent of the population, and experts speculate that by 2027, Holmes County could become the first county in the US where more than half the residents were Amish. The Amish & Mennonite Heritage Center in Berlin explains traditional ways of the Amish and provides an illustrated history for visitors in its 10-foot-by-265-foot mural.

The overall Amish population of the area, centered on Holmes County, is the largest Amish community in the world. Called locally "Amish Country", it draws many visitors to the county, thus making tourism an important sector of the local economy.

In Holmes County Amish Settlements there are several Old Order Amish affiliations. The Holmes Old Order Amish affiliation is the main and original affiliation, the Swartzentruber Amish with three subgroups, that originated in 1917 in Holmes County, are the most conservative Amish in Holmes county. There are also Andy Weaver Amish (formed 1952), Stutzman-Troyer Amish, Old Order Tobe Amish and Roman Amish on the conservative side, whereas the New Order Amish (formed in the early 1960s), the New Order Tobe Amish the New Order Amish Christian Fellowship are on the more progressive side. Holmes County is home of more Amish affiliations than any other place in the world.

See also

 National Register of Historic Places listings in Holmes County, Ohio
 USS Holmes County (LST-836)

References

External links

 Holmes County official site
 Visit Amish Country (Holmes Co. Tourism Bureau)

 
Appalachian Ohio
Counties of Appalachia
1825 establishments in Ohio
Populated places established in 1825
Amish in Ohio
Pennsylvania Dutch culture in Ohio
German-American culture in Ohio
Swiss-American culture in Ohio